Chase is a surname in the English language, especially popular in the United States

Notable people with the surname "Chase" include

A
Adam Chase (writer), American writer
Adelaide Cole Chase (1868–1944), American painter
Adele Stimmel Chase (1917–2000), American artist
Alison Becker Chase (born 1946), American dance instructor
Allan Chase (born 1956), American musician
Amanda Chase (born 1969), American politician
Amos Chase (1718–1818), American archdeacon
Andy Chase, American musician
Annazette Chase (born 1943), American actress
Anrie Chase (born 2004), Japanese footballer
Anthony Chase, American professor
Archibald Alderman Chase (1884–1917), English military officer
Arlen F. Chase (born 1953), American archaeologist
Arthur Chase (disambiguation), multiple people
Athol Kennedy Chase (1936–2020), Australian anthropologist
Augustus Sabin Chase (1828–1896), American industrialist

B
Bailey Chase (born 1972), American actor
Barrie Chase, American actress
Beatrice Chase (1874–1955), British writer
Ben Chase (1923–1998), American football player
Bill Chase (1934–1974), American trumpet player
Bob Chase (1926–2016), American sportscaster
Bobbie Chase, American editor
Brian Chase (born 1978), American musician
Brian Chase (basketball) (born 1981), American basketball player
Bruce Chase (1912–2001), American composer

C
Carl T. Chase (1902–1987), American physicist
Carlton Chase (1794–1870), American bishop
Cheryl Chase (disambiguation), multiple people
Chevy Chase (born 1943), American comedian and actor
Carroll Chase (1878–1960), American philatelist
Charles Chase (disambiguation), multiple people
Chris Chase (1924–2013), American model
Claire Chase (born 1978), American musician
Claudia Chase, American politician
Clifford Chase, American novelist
Clifton "Jiggs" Chase (born 1940), American musician
Colin Chase (1886–1937), American actor
Colin Robert Chase (1935–1984), American academic
C. Thurston Chase (1819–1870), American academic administrator

D
Dana B. Chase (1848–1897), American photographer
Daveigh Chase (born 1990), American actress
David Chase (born 1945), American television writer
Debbie Chase (born 1966), New Zealand field hockey player
Debra Martin Chase (born 1956), American television producer
De Lanson Alson Newton Chase (1875–1953), American politician
Diane Chase, Canadian musician
Diane Zaino Chase (born 1953), American anthropologist
Doris Totten Chase (1923–2008), American painter
Drummond Percy Chase (1820–1902), English academic administrator
Duane Chase (born 1950), American software engineer
Dudley Chase (1771–1846), American politician

E
Earl "Flat" Chase (1910–1954), Canadian baseball player
Edith Chase (1924–2017), American activist
Edna Woolman Chase (1877–1957), American editor
Edsel Chase (born 1968), Barbadian sprinter
Edward Leigh Chase (1884–1965), American painter
Eleanor Barrow Chase (1918–2002), American social worker
Emory A. Chase (1854–1921), American judge
Enoch Chase (1809–1892), American physician
Eric Chase (1931–1989), Guyanese cricketer

F
Fanny DuBois Chase (1828–1902), American social reformer and author
Flo Chase, Australian singer-songwriter
Frank Swift Chase (1886–1959), American painter
Frederic Chase (1853–1925), British academic and bishop

G
Gail M. Chase, American accountant
George Chase (disambiguation), multiple people
Gilbert Chase (1906–1992), American historian

H
Hal Chase (1883–1947), American baseball player
Haldon Chase (1923–2006), American archaeologist
Harrie B. Chase (1889–1969), American lawyer and judge
Harry Chase (disambiguation), multiple people
Harold W. Chase (1922–1982), American military officer and educator
Hayley Chase (born 1991), American actress
Heather Chase, American politician
Helen C. Chase, American statistician
Henry Chase (disambiguation), multiple people
Hiram Chase (1861–1928), American lawyer
Homer Chase (1917–1985), American activist
Horace Chase (1810–1886), American politician
Howard Chase (born 1954), British academic and chemical engineer
H. Stephen Chase (1903–1969), American financier

I
Ilka Chase (1905–1978), American actress
Ira Joy Chase (1834–1895), American politician

J
Jack Chase (disambiguation), multiple people
Jackson B. Chase (1890–1974), American politician
Ja'Marr Chase (born 2000), American football player
James Chase (disambiguation), multiple people
Jeff Chase (born 1968), American actor
Jehu V. Chase (1869–1937), American naval officer
Jessica Chase (born 1978), Canadian swimmer
Jessie Kalmbach Chase (1879–1970), American painter
J. Mitchell Chase (1891–1945), American politician
John Chase (disambiguation), multiple people
Jonathan Chase (disambiguation), multiple people
Joseph Cummings Chase (1878–1965), American artist
J. Richard Chase (1930–2010), American academic administrator
J. Smeaton Chase (1864–1923), English-American author
Julie Chase (born 1956), Canadian luger

K
Kate Chase (1840–1899), American socialite
Kathleen Chase, American politician
Kelly Chase (born 1967), Canadian ice hockey player
Ken Chase (disambiguation), multiple people
Kendall Chase (born 1994), American rower
Kevin Chase (born 1976), Canadian singer-songwriter

L
Leah Chase (1923–2019), American chef
Levi R. Chase (1917–1994), American pilot
Lillian Chase (1894–1987), Canadian physician
Lincoln Chase (1926–1980), American songwriter
Liz Chase (1950–2018), Zimbabwean field hockey player
Loretta Chase (born 1949), American writer
Lorraine Chase (born 1951), English actress
Louisa Chase (1951–2016), American painter
Louise L. Chase (1840–1906), American social reformer
Lucia Chase (1897–1986), American dancer
Lucien Bonaparte Chase (1817–1864), American politician

M
Mabel Augusta Chase (1865–1939), American physicist
Mack C. Chase (born 1931), American businessman
Malcolm Chase (1957–2020), American historian
Maralyn Chase (born 1942), American politician
Marc Chase (born 1960), American radio executive
Margaret Chase (1905–1997), American humanitarian
Margo Chase (1958–2017), American graphic designer
Marian Emma Chase (1844–1905), British painter
Mark Wayne Chase (born 1951), British botanist
Martha Chase (1927–2003), American biologist
Martha Jenks Chase (1851–1925), American doll maker
Martin Chase (born 1974), American football player
Mary Chase (disambiguation), multiple people
Melissa Chase, American cryptographer
Merrill Chase (1905–2004), American immunologist
Mildred Portney Chase (1921–1991), American pianist

N
Nash Chase, New Zealand singer
Nicholas Frances Chase (born 1966), American composer
Norton Chase (1861–1922), American politician

O
Oscar Chase, American academic
Owen Chase (1797–1869), American sailor

P
Parker Chase (born 2001), American racing driver
Paul Chase (disambiguation), multiple people
Pauline Chase (1885–1962), American actress
Pearl Chase (1888–1979), American civic leader
Peter Chase (born 1993), Irish cricketer
Phyllis Chase (1897–1977), English illustrator
Pliny Chase (1820–1886), American mathematician

R
Ralph Chase (1902–1989), American football player
Rangi Chase (born 1986), New Zealand rugby league footballer
Rangi Chase (rugby league, born 1918) (1918–1998), New Zealand rugby league footballer
Ray Chase (disambiguation), multiple people
Reuben Chase (1754–1824), American naval officer
Rhoda Chase (1914–1978), American singer
Richard Chase (disambiguation), multiple people
Rick Chase (1957–2002), American disc jockey
Robert Chase (disambiguation), multiple people
Robin Chase, American entrepreneur
Roderick Chase (born 1967), Barbadian cyclist
Roger Chase (born 1953), British violist
Roger D. Chase, American politician
Roland E. Chase (1867–1948), American politician
Ronald Chase (born 1934), American photographer
Roston Chase (born 1992), Barbadian cricketer

S
Salmon P. Chase (1808–1873), American judge
Samuel Chase (disambiguation), multiple people
Sara Chase, American actress
Sarah Chase (1837–??), American activist
Simeon B. Chase (1828–1909), American politician
Simon Chase, British-American sound engineer
Solon Chase (1823–1909), American farmer and politician
Stephan Chase (1954–2019), British actor
Stephanie Chase (born 1957), American violinist
Stephen Chase (disambiguation), multiple people
Steve Chase, American activist
Stuart Chase (1888–1985), American economist
Sylvia Chase (1938–2019), American broadcast journalist

T
Tabitha Fringe Chase (born 1977), American activist
Thomas Chase (??–1449), Irish politician
Thomas Chase (educator) (1827–1892), American educator
Thornton Chase (1847–1912), American religious figure
Tom Chase (born 1965), American pornographic actor
Truddi Chase (1935–2010), American author

V
Vera Chase (born 1970), Czech translator
Vivian Chase (1902–1935), American criminal

W
Warren Chase (1813–1891), American politician
Wendy Chase, American politician
W. Howard Chase (1910–2003), American businessman
Will Chase (born 1970), American actor
William Chase (disambiguation), multiple people
Winifred B. Chase (1877–1949), American botanist

Z
Zacheus Chase (1837–1900), American politician
Zanna Chase, Australian oceanographer

Fictional characters
Cordelia Chase, a character on the television series Buffy the Vampire Slayer
Danny Chase, a character in the comic book series DC Comics
Johnny Chase, a character on the television series Entourage
Vincent Chase, a character on the television series Entourage

See also
Chase (given name)
Chase (disambiguation)
General Chase (disambiguation)
Governor Chase (disambiguation)
Justice Chase (disambiguation)
Senator Chase (disambiguation)

References

English-language surnames
Surnames of English origin
Surnames